The Satellite Sentinel Project (SSP) was conceived by George Clooney and Enough Project co-founder John Prendergast during their October 2010 visit to South Sudan. Through the use of satellite imagery, SSP provides an early warning system to deter mass atrocities in a given situation by focusing world attention  and generating rapid responses to human rights and human security concerns taking place in that situation.

Activities
SSP currently produces reports on the state of the conflict in the border regions between Sudan and South Sudan. DigitalGlobe provides satellite imagery and analysis. Their reporting is then released to the press and policymakers by the Enough Project. In 2011, the Satellite Sentinel Project detected images of freshly-dug mass grave sites in the Southern Kordofan state of South Sudan, where Sudan’s Arab military has been targeting a black ethnic minority. SSP was the first to provide evidence consistent with the razing of the villages of Maker Abior, Todach, and Tajalei in Sudan's contested Abyei region, and the project has discovered eight alleged mass graves in South Kordofan, Sudan. SSP also plans to investigate how the illegal trade in diamonds, gold, ivory and other resources funds the activities of human-rights abusers.

Organization and funding
Not On Our Watch Project provided seed money to launch the Satellite Sentinel Project.  The Enough Project contributes field reports, policy analysis and communications strategy, and, together with Not On Our Watch and its SUDANNOW partners, pressures policymakers by urging the public to act. Google and Internet strategy firm Trellon, LLC collaborate to design the web platform.

Limits to effectiveness
Patrick Meier, a crisis mapping expert, has observed that the deterrent value of any surveillance is diminished in the absence of consequences for the perpetrators of violence. Specific to Sudan, other technologies such as drones are necessary to differentiate threats from nomads in order to generate actionable information.

References

External links
 
 Satellite Images May indicate War Crimes in Abyei, Joe DeCapua, Voice of America News, 2 June 2011
 Satellite Sentinel Project: Opening Access to Crisis Areas
 

Satellite imagery
War in Darfur
Genocide research and prevention organisations
Science and technology in Sudan
Science and technology in South Sudan
Human rights in Sudan
War crime prevention
Remote sensing programs